Carona is an unincorporated community in Cherokee County, Kansas, United States.

History
Carona was originally called Carbona, because the area was rich with coal and coal is a carbon-based fuel.

A post office was opened in Carona in 1905, and remained in operation until it was discontinued in 1988.

Area attractions
Carona is the home of the Heart of the Heartlands museum complex dedicated to preserving the history railroads had in the mining industry. The complex includes a railroad museum; a restored Missouri Pacific Depot from Carona; a restored Missouri Pacific Depot from Boston, Missouri; and, a collection of railroad locomotives and cars, including the cosmetically restored KCS Steam Locomotive #1023 that once was displayed at Schlanger Park in Pittsburg, Kansas.

References

Further reading

External links
 Cherokee County maps: Current, Historic, KDOT

Unincorporated communities in Cherokee County, Kansas
Unincorporated communities in Kansas